Puraz or Pooraz or Powraz may refer to:
 Puraz, Chaharmahal and Bakhtiari
 Puraz, Ardal, Chaharmahal and Bakhtiari Province